Nalgonda Assembly constituency is a constituency of the Telangana Legislative Assembly, India. It is one of 12 constituencies in the Nalgonda district. It is part of Nalgonda Lok Sabha constituency.

Kancharla Bhupal Reddy of Telangana Rashtra Samithi won the seat for the first time in December 2018 Assembly election against Komatireddy Venkat Reddy of Indian National Congress.

Komatireddy Venkat Reddy of Indian National Congress won the seat for the fourth time in 2014 Assembly election.

Mandals 
Nalgonda Assembly Constituency comprises the following Mandals:

Members of the Legislative Assembly

Election results

Telangana Legislative Assembly election, 2018

Telangana Legislative Assembly election, 2014 
Election results:

Andhra Pradesh Legislative Assembly election, 2009

See also
 Nalgonda
 List of constituencies of Telangana Legislative Assembly

References

Assembly constituencies of Telangana
Assembly constituencies of Nalgonda district